José Martín Colmenarejo Pérez (7 April 1936 – 27 November 1995) was a Spanish racing cyclist. Professional from 1960 to 1966, he finished second in the 1963 Vuelta a España behind Jacques Anquetil.

Major results

1961
 1st Stages 3b (TTT) & 7 Volta a Catalunya
1962
 1st Stages 7 & 9 Vuelta a Colombia
 2nd Campeonato Vasco-Navarro de Montaña
 3rd Overall Vuelta a la Comunidad Valenciana
1963
 1st  Overall Vuelta a la Comunidad Valenciana
1st Stage 5
 1st Stage 3 Tour de Suisse
 2nd Overall Vuelta a España
1964
 5th Overall Tour de Suisse
1st Stage 4
1965
 1st Stage 13 Vuelta a España
 1st Stage 15 Volta a Portugal

References

External links
 

1936 births
1995 deaths
Spanish male cyclists
Cyclists from Madrid
Spanish Vuelta a España stage winners
Tour de Suisse stage winners